Lizzi Waldmüller (25 May 1904 in Knittelfeld, Styria – 8 April 1945 in Vienna) was an Austrian singer and actress whose breakthrough to stardom came through her role as Rachel in the Willi Forst movie Bel Ami in 1939.

Waldmüller had her theatre debut in Innsbruck in the 1920s, before finding success in Graz, Vienna and eventually abroad - in Germany. She became renowned through the Paul Lincke song 'Ich bin die Frau, von der man spricht' (I am the woman they're talking about). At the beginning of the 1930s, she played supporting roles next to stars such as Heinz Rühmann, Hans Albers and her husband Max Hansen, whom she divorced in 1938.

She died on 8 April 1945 in an air raid in Vienna, Austria, a month before the end of World War II. Her memorial can be found in Friedhof Hadersdorf-Weidlingau, Hadersdorf-Weidlingau, Penzing, Vienna.

Filmography
 1931: The Spanish Fly
 1932: Strafsache van Geldern (Case Van Geldern)
 1932: Love at First Sight
 1933: Laughing Heirs - with Heinz Rühmann
 1934: Peer Gynt - with Hans Albers
 1936: Shipwrecked Max
 1939: Bel Ami - with Willi Forst
 1940: Traummusik - with Benjamino Gigli
 1940: Casanova heiratet
 1940: Ritorno (Musica di sogno)
 1941:  (Mistress Moon)
 1941: Everything for Gloria 
 1942: A Night in Venice
 1943: Ein Walzer mit Dir
 1943: Liebeskomödie
 1944: Es lebe die Liebe - with Johannes Heesters
 1945: A Man Like Maximilian

References

External links
 

1904 births
1945 deaths
People from Knittelfeld
Austrian stage actresses
Austrian film actresses
20th-century Austrian women singers
Deaths by airstrike during World War II
20th-century Austrian actresses
Austrian civilians killed in World War II